This is a list of notable fixed-wing military air combat losses since the end of the Vietnam War grouped by the year that the loss occurred. This list is intended for military aircraft lost due to enemy action during combat. For military aircraft lost due to accidental causes, refer to the list of notable incidents and accidents involving military aircraft. For civil aircraft losses, refer to List of accidents and incidents involving commercial aircraft.

1983 (Multinational Force in Lebanon)

December 4 – An A-6 Intruder (Bureau Number 152915) and an A-7 Corsair II (Bureau Number 157468) were shot down by Syrian 9K31 Strela-1 or Strela 2 infrared homing missiles while attacking Syrian army SAM batteries in Lebanon in the mountains east of Beirut. The pilot of the A-6, Lieutenant Mark Lange (flying from USS John F. Kennedy), was killed; his Bombardier/Navigator, Lieutenant Bobby Goodman, ejected and was captured by Syrian soldiers. Lt. Goodman was held for 30 days before his release was facilitated by Jesse Jackson. Lt. Lange's body was returned. From the USS Independence (CV-62), the A-7, Commander Edward Andrews managed to guide his failing Corsair over coastal waters before ejecting; he was rescued by a Lebanese fishing boat and safely returned to the U.S. Marines.

1986 (Operation El Dorado Canyon)

April 15 – An F-111F Aardvark (Serial Number 70-2389) was shot down by anti-aircraft artillery (AAA) over Libya. The pilot (Major Fernando L. Ribas-Dominicci) and Weapon Systems Officer (Captain Paul F. Lorence) were killed. Major Ribas-Dominicci's body was returned to the US in 1989. Captain Lorence's body was never found. He is still listed as killed in action, body not recovered (KIA-BNR).

1991 (Operation Desert Shield/Desert Storm)

January 17 – An F/A-18C Hornet (Bureau Number 163484) was shot down by an Iraqi Mikoyan-Gurevich MiG-25 in an air-to-air engagement. The pilot, Lieutenant Commander Michael Scott Speicher, of VFA-81 was killed but his body was not found until July 2009.
January 17 – An A-6E Intruder (Bureau Number 161668) was shot down by a surface-to-air missile over western Iraq. The pilot, Lieutenant Robert Wetzel, and Navigator/Bombardier, Lieutenant Jeffrey Norton Zaun, were captured. They were released on March 3.
January 17 – An F-15E Strike Eagle (Serial Number 88-1689) was shot down by anti-aircraft artillery (AAA). The pilot, Major Thomas F. Koritz, and Weapons Systems Officer, Lieutenant Colonel Donnie R. Holland, were killed. Their bodies were recovered.
January 18 – An A-6E Intruder (Bureau Number 152928) was shot down by anti-aircraft artillery two miles from the Iraqi shore after dropping mines on a waterway linking the Iraqi naval base of Umm Qasr with the Persian Gulf. The USN package was engaged by ZU-23-2 ground anti-aircraft guns and Iraqi naval vessels. The pilot, Lieutenant William Thomas Costen and Navigator/Bombardier, Lieutenant Charlie Turner, were killed. Their bodies were recovered.
January 18 – An OV-10 Bronco (Bureau Number 155435) was shot down by a surface-to-air missile. The pilot, Lieutenant Colonel Clifford M. Acree, and observer, Chief Warrant Officer Guy L. Hunter Jr., were captured. They were released on March 6.
January 18 – An F-4G Wild Weasel (Serial Number 69-7571) crashed in the Saudi Arabian desert after attacking Iraqi air defenses. An investigation found that a single enemy 23 mm anti-aircraft artillery (AAA) round had punctured the fuel tank, causing fuel starvation. The pilot, Captain Tim Burke, and Electronic Warfare Officer, Captain Juan Galindez, ejected over friendly territory and were rescued.
January 19 – An F-15E Strike Eagle (Serial Number 88-1692) was shot down by a V-750AK (SA-2E) surface-to-air missile. The pilot, Colonel David W. Eberly, and Weapon Systems Officer, Major Thomas E. Griffith, were captured. They were released on March 6 and March 3 respectively.
January 19 – An F-16C Fighting Falcon (Serial Number 87-0228) was shot down by a 2K12 Kub (SA-6) surface-to-air missile. The pilot, Captain Harry 'Mike' Roberts, was captured. He was released on March 6.
January 19 – An F-16C Fighting Falcon (Serial Number 87-0257) was shot down by an S-125 (SA-3) surface-to-air missile. The pilot, Major Jeffrey Scott Tice, was captured. He was released on March 6.
January 21 – An F-14A+ Tomcat (Bureau Number 161430) was shot down by a V-750AK (SA-2E) surface-to-air missile while on an escort mission near Al Asad airbase in Iraq. The pilot, Lieutenant Devon Jones, was rescued by USAF Special Operations Forces but the Radar Intercept Officer, Lieutenant Larry Slade, was captured. He remained a POW until his release on March 3.
January 24 – An AV-8B Harrier II (Bureau Number 163518) was shot down by MANPADS. The pilot, Captain Michael C. Berryman, was captured. He was released on March 6.
January 31 – An AC-130H Spectre (Serial Number 69-6567) was shot down by a surface-to-air missile during the battle of Khafji. The entire crew of 14 were killed. Their bodies were recovered.
February 2 – An A-6E Intruder (Bureau Number 155632) was shot down by anti-aircraft artillery (AAA). The pilot, Lieutenant Commander Barry T. Cooke, and Navigator/Bombardier, Lieutenant junior grade Patrick K. Connor, were killed. Cooke's body was never found (officially listed as KIA-BNR) and Connor's body was recovered.
February 2 – An A-10A Thunderbolt II (Serial Number 80-0248) was shot down by an Igla-1 (SA-16) surface-to-air missile. The pilot, Captain Richard Dale Storr, was captured. He was released on March 6.
February 5 – An F/A-18A Hornet (Bureau Number 163096) crashed in the Persian Gulf. The pilot, Lieutenant Robert Dwyer, was lost over the North Persian Gulf after a successful mission to Iraq. Dwyer served in Carrier Air Wing 8 (CVW-8). His body was never recovered (officially listed as KIA-BNR).
February 9 – An AV-8B Harrier II (Bureau Number 162081) was shot down by a surface-to-air missile. The pilot, Captain Russell A.C. Sanborn, was captured. He was released on March 6.
February 13 – An EF-111A (Serial Number 66-0023), callsign Ratchet 75, crashed into terrain while maneuvering to evade a missile fired by an enemy Mirage F1 fighter, killing the pilot, Captain Douglas L. Bradt, and the Electronic Warfare Officer, Captain Paul R. Eichenlaub.
February 15 – An A-10A Thunderbolt II (Serial Number 78-0722) was shot down 60 miles northwest of Kuwait city while attacking Republican Guard targets. Thought to have been engaged by a SA-13 Gopher SAM. Pilot Lieutenant Robert Sweet ejected and was taken prisoner. He was released on March 6.
February 15 – An A-10A Thunderbolt II (Serial Number : 79-0130 Hit by ground fire approximately 60 miles northwest of Kuwait city while attacking Republican Guard targets. Thought to have been engaged by SA-13 Gopher SAM. Pilot Captain Steven Phyllis was killed. Phyllis died while protecting his downed wingman (1st Lieutenant Robert James Sweet). Phyllis' body was later recovered.
February 19 – An A-10A Thunderbolt II (Serial Number 76-0543) was shot down by a Strela-1 (SA-9) surface-to-air missile 62 nm northwest of Kuwait city. The pilot, Lieutenant Colonel Jeffery Fox (call sign "Nail 53"), was injured as he ejected, captured and held as a POW, until his release on March 6.
February 22 – An A-10A Thunderbolt II (Serial Number 79-0181) made a wheels up, hard stick landing after being hit by a SAM. The pilot, Captain Rich Biley, brought the aircraft in at King Khalid Military City, Forward Operating Location 1 where it was stripped of parts, some sent to King Fahd International Airport, Main Operating Base for use on other aircraft, and then buried in the desert. Biley was unhurt during the crash-landing.
February 23 – An AV-8B Harrier II (Bureau Number 161573) crashed when it failed to recover from a high angle dive during a night attack on a tank park in Ali Al Salem, Kuwait, possibly hit by AAA or a MANPAD. The pilot, Captain James N. Wilbourn), was killed and his body was later recovered.
February 25 – An AV-8B Harrier II (Bureau Number 163190) was hit by MANPADS and crashed while trying to land at Al Jaber airfield, Kuwait. The pilot, Captain Scott Walsh, ejected safely.
February 25 – An OV-10 Bronco (Bureau Number 155424) was shot down by a surface-to-air missile. The pilot, Major Joseph Small III), was captured and the observer, Captain David Spellacy), was killed. Major Small was released on March 6 and Captain Spellacy's body was recovered.
February 27 – An AV-8B Harrier II (Bureau Number 162740) was shot down by MANPADS. The pilot, Captain Reginald Underwood, was killed and his body was later recovered.
February 27 – An A-10A Thunderbolt II (Serial Number 77-0197), call sign Nail 51, crashed after a reconnaissance mission over Kuwait, killing pilot Lieutenant Patrick Olson (posthumously promoted to Captain). The aircraft had been hit by a surface-to-air missile and, after losing all its hydraulics, was attempting a landing at King Khalid Military City, Forward Operating Location 1 in Manual Reversion in extreme weather conditions and with only one engine.
February 27 – An F-16C Fighting Falcon (Serial Number 84-1390) was shot down by an Igla-1 (SA-16) MANPADS. The pilot, Captain William Andrews, was captured. He was released on March 6.

1995 (Operation Deny Flight)

June 2 – An F-16C Fighting Falcon (Serial Number 89-2032) was shot down by a Serb 2K12 Kub SAM (NATO reporting name: SA-6 'Gainful') near Mrkonjić Grad, while on patrol over Bosnia. Its pilot, Captain Scott O'Grady, ejected and was later rescued by a USMC CH-53 Sea Stallion helicopter on 8 June.

1999 (Operation Allied Force)

March 27 – An F-117 Nighthawk (Serial Number 82-0806) stealth ground-attack jet was shot down by a Yugoslav SA-3 surface-to-air missile during the Kosovo War. The pilot, Lieutenant Colonel Dale Zelko, survived and was subsequently rescued.
May 2 – An F-16C Fighting Falcon (Serial Number 88-0550) was shot down by a Yugoslav SA-3 SAM. The aircraft crashed near Šabac, in a rural area of Serbia. The pilot, Lieutenant Colonel David L. Goldfein, future 4 Star General and Chief of Staff of the Air Force, survived and was subsequently rescued.

2003–2011 (Operation Iraqi Freedom)

April 2, 2003 –An F/A-18 Hornet of VFA-195 is shot down by Iraqi forces using US Patriot missile, killing the pilot.
April 7, 2003- During a mission over Baghdad, Kim Campbells A-10 was heavily damaged by Iraqi AAA. The pilot managed to safely return to base.
April 7, 2003 - An F-15E Strike Eagle (Serial Number 88-1694) was shot down over Tikrit by Iraqi forces. The pilot, Eric Das, and Weapons Systems Officer, William Watkins, were killed. Their bodies were recovered.
April 8, 2003 – An A-10A Thunderbolt II (Serial Number 78-0691) was shot down over downtown Baghdad by an Iraqi Roland surface-to-air missile. The pilot survived.
May 2, 2005 – 2 F/A-18 Hornets of VMFA-323 are shot down by Iraqi/Al-Qaeda Insurgents over south-central Iraq. Both pilots killed.
November 27, 2006- An F-16 Fighting Falcon is shot down by Iraqi/Al-Qaeda insurgents near Fallujah while on a low-altitude ground-strafing run. The pilot, Major Troy Gilbert, was killed.
June 15, 2007- An F-16 Fighting Falcon  from the Ohio ANG was shot down just after taking off by Iraqi/Al-Qaeda insurgents. The pilot, Maj. Kevin Sonnenberg, was killed.
July 16, 2007- An F-16 Fighting Falcon was shot down by Iraqi/Al-Qaeda insurgents just after taking off from Baghdad airbase. Pilot managed to eject. 
January 7, 2008- 2 F/A-18 Hornets operating from USS Harry S. Truman were shot down by Iraqi/Al-Qaeda insurgents while on a mission in the Gulf. All three pilots were rescued
June 27, 2008- A C-130 Hercules was heavily damaged by Iraqi/Al-Qaeda insurgents. The aircraft managed to leave enemy territory and declared an emergency landing to Baghdad Airbase. All 38 on board were transported to nearby Sather Air Base for medical evaluation.
November 12, 2008- An F-16 Fighting Falcon was damaged by Iraqi/Al-Qaeda insurgents before taking off from Baghdad Airbase. The pilot manged to eject.

2001-2021 (War in Afghanistan) 

 December 12, 2001- A B-1 Lancer (86-0114) was shot down by Taliban/Al-Qaeda insurgents while on a bombing run. The aircraft managed to leave the target area but was severely damaged by enemy fire making the aircraft uncontrollable. The pilots managed to eject safely. 
 January 9, 2002- A KC-130 Hercules was heavily damaged by Taliban/Al-Qaeda Insurgents causing the aircraft to crash on a mountain near Pakistan. All on board were killed
 February 13, 2002- A MC-130P Shadow was heavily damaged by Taliban/Al-Qaeda Insurgents causing the aircraft to crash in the Hindu Kush Mountain range. All on board miraculously survived.
 June 12, 2002- A MC-130H Combat Talon was destroyed by Taliban/Al-Qaeda insurgents while preparing for takeoff. Steve Coll in his 2018 book Directorate S, revealed that the Pentagon released a false story about the incident to downplay the dangers of Afghanistan.
 June 22, 2005- A U-2 Spyplane was hit by Taliban/Al-Qaeda ground fire causing severe damage to the aircraft. The pilot had to abort the mission and was killed upon landing at Al Dhafra Air Base in the UAE.
 July 28, 2009- An F-15E Strike Eagle was shot down by Taliban insurgents using MANPADS. All pilots on board were killed.
 October 13, 2009- A U.S. Army C-12 Huron was shot down by Taliban insurgents in the Nuristan province. All pilots on board were killed.
 March 31, 2010- A U.S. Navy E-2 Hawkeye was severely damaged by Taliban ground fire causing the aircraft to abort the mission. The aircraft managed to leave enemy territory but by then was uncontrollable and crashed in the Arabian sea. 3 were rescued while one was deceased.
 April 9, 2010- A CV-22 Osprey was shot down by Taliban ground fire near Qalat, Zabul Province killing all on board.
 September 14, 2012- 1 C-130 Hercules and 8 USMC AV-8B Harrier II aircraft were destroyed by Taliban insurgents during  The attack on Camp Bastion. This became the worst U.S. aircraft loss in 1 day since the Vietnam War. Two Marines from the VMA-211 were killed in the attack.
 April 3, 2013- An F-16 Fighting Falcon was shot down by Taliban insurgents in Eastern Afghanistan's Parwan province killing the pilot.
 April 27, 2013- A USAF MC-12 Liberty was shot down by Taliban insurgents in Shahjoi district of Zabul province, about 110 miles (180 kilometers) northeast of Kandahar Air Field, killing all on board.
 May 3, 2013- A Boeing KC-135 Stratotanker was shot down by Taliban insurgents seconds after takeoff in Kyrgyzstan. All three crew members were killed in the crash.
 January 10, 2014- Two US service members and a contractor pilot died near Bagram Air Base when a Beechcraft RC-12 Guardrail was shot down by Taliban militants. 
 October 2, 2015- A C-130J operated by Dyess Air Force Base, was shot down by Taliban insurgents immediately after takeoff at Jalalabad Airfield killing all 11 on board, along with two people on the ground.
 October 19, 2015- An F-16 Fighting Falcon was severely damaged by Taliban ground fire while on a strafe run. The pilot managed to return to base.
 March 29, 2016- An F-16 Fighting Falcon was shot down by Taliban insurgents while flying in the Seh Dukān locality. The pilot managed to eject.
 January 27, 2020- A U.S. Air Force E-11A was reported crashed in Afghanistan by US officials. The Taliban claimed it was shot down with all its occupants killed, which US officials denied. this was the last acknowledged US fatal aviation loss of the war.

2011 (Libyan Civil War) 

 March 21, 2011- An F-15E Strike Eagle (91–304) was shot down by the Libyan Arab Jamahiriya forces in Bengazi, Libya. The 2 pilots were able to eject to friendly territory and were eventually rescued by US Marines.

2011-Present (Syrian Civil War) 

 November 30th, 2014- An F-16 Fighting Falcon was shot down by Syrian/ISIS insurgents moments after taking off. The pilot was killed. 
 September 29th, 2017- A USMC MV-22 Osprey was shot down by Syrian/ISIS insurgents. All on board managed to survive while 2 on board were injured.

Table

See also
 List of aircraft losses of the Vietnam War
 List of combat victories of United States military aircraft since the Vietnam War

References
Official Desert Storm Prisoner/Missing List

United States aviation-related lists
United States military-related lists